Sri Simha Koduri (born 23 February 1996) is an Indian actor who works in Telugu films. He first appeared as a child artist in Yamadonga (2007). After working in various off-screen roles, Simha made his debut as a lead actor in Mathu Vadalara (2019) for which he won SIIMA Award for Best Male Debut – Telugu.

Early life 
Sri Simha was born on 23 February 1996 in Hyderabad of present-day Telangana. His father, M. M. Keeravani, is a music director. He is the nephew of director S. S. Rajamouli. His elder brother Kaala Bhairava is a singer and music composer in Telugu films.

Career 
Sri Simha is a regular in S. S. Rajamouli's films. He was a child artiste in Yamadonga (2007), playing the younger version of Jr. NTR's character. He also featured in a promotional song "Follows Follows" along with Jr. NTR. For Baahubali 2: The Conclusion (2017), he worked as an assistant music director, while his elder brother, Kaala Bhairava, was a singer for the film. He is now a leading music director. Sri Simha worked as assistant to Sukumar in Rangasthalam (2018). 

Simha made his debut in a lead role in Mathu Vadalara (2019). In a review of the film by The Times of India, a critic stated that he "delivers a decent performance" and how "He looks natural in his rugged look and nails scenes which require him to show emotions like fear or anger". Simha won SIIMA Award for Best Male Debut – Telugu for the film. In 2021, he starred in Thellavarithe Guruvaram. First look poster of his upcoming film Bhaag Saale was released on 7 October 2022.

Filmography 

All films are in Telugu, unless otherwise noted.

References

External links 

Living people
Male actors in Telugu cinema
Indian male film actors
21st-century Indian male actors
1996 births
Telugu male actors
Male actors from Hyderabad, India